Dean Jeffrey Russ (born 4 March 1986) is an Australian former first class cricketer for the Victoria state cricket team. He was a left-handed batsman and wicket-keeper.

Career
A left-hand opening batsman, Russ made his Sheffield Shield debut at the age of 28 during the 2013-14 season and played two Sheffield Shield matches for Victoria in 2014, returning 77 runs from three innings with a best of 47.  He captained Footscray-Edgewater Cricket Club to the Victorian Premier Cricket title. In November 2018 Russ became the club’s leading First-XI run scorer.

In September 2017 Russ was appointed coaching and talent development manager at Cricket Victoria leading a team which included Guy McKenna and former Australian player Cathryn Fitzpatrick.

Personal life
Away from cricket, Russ has worked as a high school teacher.

References

Living people
1986 births
Place of birth missing (living people)
Cricketers from Melbourne
Australian cricket coaches